The 1986 Artistic Gymnastics World Cup was held in Beijin, China in 1986.

Medal winners

References

1986
Artistic Gymnastics World Cup
International gymnastics competitions hosted by China
1986 in Chinese sport